Memba Bay is a bay in Mozambique. It is located in Nampula Province, north of Fernao Veloso Bay, on the northern coast of Mozambique.

Currently the bay is a popular scuba diving area, with numerous diving spots.

Geography
Memba Bay is open towards the east and is named after the town of Memba, Memba District, located in the bay. There are deep inlets in the southern shore of the inner bay, including Porto de Duarte Pedroso, one of the main harbours of Mozambique, and Porto de Bocage.

See also
 Geography of Mozambique

References

External links

Views of Memba Bay, Mozambique

Bays of the Indian Ocean
Bays of Mozambique